The Men's javelin throw at the 2014 Commonwealth Games as part of the athletics programme took place at Hampden Park between 1 and 2 August 2014.

Results

Qualifying round
Qualification: Qualifying Performance 78.00 (Q) or at least 12 best performers (q) advance to the Final.

Final

References

Men's javelin throw
2014